Phase is a music-themed iPod game created by Harmonix exclusively for the iPod click wheel interface. It is similar to other Harmonix games Amplitude and FreQuency.

Gameplay 
Phase is played in a forced single-point perspective view of a three line track. Down each line come colored circles, and the player must click the corresponding button on the click wheel when the circle reaches the bottom of the screen. The circles are arranged on the track in relation to the beat of the music track being played.

Additionally, there are occasional series of smaller, more closely spaced dots that will sweep across the track. These require the player to swipe their finger across the click wheel at the correct pace, instead of clicking the wheel buttons.

The game comes with Easy, Medium, and Hard settings available for immediate play. After completing a marathon with the Hard difficulty setting, Expert mode is made available. In the same way, completing a marathon on Expert unlocks Insane mode. The difficulty settings control the speed of the track and the number of the dots, as well as their value.

Soundtrack 

Phase ships with seven songs, some by bands of Harmonix employees, but can be made to work with any song on the iPod as long as it is longer than 30 seconds but less than 30 minutes long. Custom songs must be added to a Phase playlist in iTunes, where they are processed for proper interpretation and become available in the game. The Phase music playlist is limited to 1,000 songs.

Included songs
"Nightlife Commando" by Bang Camaro
"Dots and Dashes" by Dealership
"Pop Music Is Not a Crime" by Freezepop
"Midnight Gamma" by Inter:sect
"Spira Mirabilis" by Kodomo
"The Theme of the Awesome" by Speck
"Dragonfly Remix" by Universal Hall Pass

Compatibility
Phase is compatible with the 3rd, 4th and 5th generation iPod Nano, the 5th generation iPod, and the 6th generation iPod Classic. It does not work with the iPhone or iPod Touch.

See also 
iPod games
Beats (video game)
Audiosurf

External links
 Harmonix website

2007 video games
IPod games
Music video games
Music generated games
Video games developed in the United States
Video games with custom soundtrack support
Harmonix games